Floorball South Africa (FSA) is the national governing body for the sport of floorball in South Africa. Floorball South Africa is an affiliate member of the International Floorball Federation (IFF).

History
Floorball South Africa became IFF Member number 56 in 2013 and was the third member from Africa following the member associations from Sierra Leone and Mozambique. FSA President, Michael Kliment officially introduced the sport to South Africa after consultations with some hockey players seeking alternative but similar sports. After a meeting with IFF officials, a development plan tailored for FSA was agreed on. Subsequently, Floorball South Africa was established on July 19, 2013 leading to its formal acceptance as an affiliate member on  September 1, 2013.

The first floorball match was played on January 18, 2014 during a FSA floorball promotion and training session in Port Elizabeth. It was played on a basketball court with the aim of attracting promising floorball players and building a database of floorball players to facilitate the creation of a league.

See also
 Sport in South Africa

References

External links
 Official website 
 International Floorball Federation website

Sports governing bodies in South Africa
2013 establishments in South Africa
Sports organizations established in 2013
Floorball governing bodies